Robert 'Bob' Edward Francis Setti (1938–2005), was a male athlete who competed for England.

Athletics career
He represented England and won a silver medal in the 4 x 440 yards relay at the 1962 British Empire and Commonwealth Games in Perth, Western Australia.

References

1938 births
2005 deaths
English male sprinters
Commonwealth Games medallists in athletics
Commonwealth Games silver medallists for England
Athletes (track and field) at the 1962 British Empire and Commonwealth Games
Medallists at the 1962 British Empire and Commonwealth Games